Austropeucedanum is a monotypic genus of flowering plants in the family Apiaceae. Its only species is Austropeucedanum oreopansil. It is endemic to Argentina.

References 

Monotypic Apiaceae genera
Apiaceae